The Pray are an ethnic group in Thailand.

Name variation
The Pray are also commonly referred to as Pray 3 among social scientists, to disambiguate them from the related Phai people, who are also sometimes referred to as Pray (Pray 1).

Language
The Pray speak a language also called Pray, which is a Khmuic language. The Khmuic languages are Austro-Asiatic.  There is some debate as to whether the Khmuic languages are of the Mon-Khmer branch, but the majority opinion is that they are not.

Geographic distribution
Population in Thailand:  38,808

References

Ethnic groups in Thailand
Khmuic peoples